Hydara may refer to:
 Deyda Hydara (1946–2004), Gambian journalist and murder victim
 Sadibou Hydara (1964–1995), Gambian military officer and politician
 Psaliodes (syn. Hydara), a genus of moth